Grenada–North Korea relations refers to bilateral relations between the People's Revolutionary Government of Grenada and the Democratic People’s Republic of Korea. The People's Revolutionary Government of Grenada and the Democratic People’s Republic of Korea established full diplomatic relations on Wednesday 9 May 1979. The two countries' diplomatic relationship ended on 24 January 1985. Grenada and the DPRK resumed diplomatic relations on 11 December 1991.

History
On April 14, 1983, the People's Revolutionary Government of Grenada and the Democratic People’s Republic of Korea signed an agreement for the Democratic People’s Republic of Korea to offer free military assistance to the People’s Revolutionary Government of Grenada. The agreement was in return for weapons and ammunitions that were worth US$12 million.

During the United States invasion of Grenada, North Korea sent 24 troops to fight against the United States and the Caribbean Peace Force troops.

Bilateral agreements

References

North Korea
Bilateral relations of North Korea